Jakov Filipović (born 17 October 1992) is a Croatian footballer who plays for Beveren as a defender.

International career
He made his debut for Croatia in a January 2017 friendly match against Chile and has earned a total of 3 caps, scoring no goals. His final international was a May 2017 friendly against Mexico.

References

External links
 

1992 births
Living people
People from Vukosavlje
Croats of Bosnia and Herzegovina
Association football central defenders
Croatian footballers
Croatia international footballers
Bosnia and Herzegovina footballers
NK BSK Bijelo Brdo players
HNK Cibalia players
NK Inter Zaprešić players
K.S.C. Lokeren Oost-Vlaanderen players
FC BATE Borisov players
S.K. Beveren players
Second Football League (Croatia) players
First Football League (Croatia) players
Croatian Football League players
Belgian Pro League players
Challenger Pro League players
Belarusian Premier League players
Croatian expatriate footballers
Expatriate footballers in Belgium
Croatian expatriate sportspeople in Belgium
Expatriate footballers in Belarus
Croatian expatriate sportspeople in Belarus